The cinnamon challenge is a viral internet food challenge. Participants film themselves eating a spoonful of ground cinnamon in under 60 seconds without drinking anything, with the video being uploaded to the Internet as evidence. The challenge is difficult and carries substantial health risks because the cinnamon coats and dries the mouth and throat, resulting in coughing, gagging, vomiting, and inhalation of cinnamon, which can in turn lead to throat irritation, breathing difficulties, and risk of pneumonia or a collapsed lung.

The challenge has been described online since 2001, and increased in popularity in 2007, peaking abruptly in January 2012 and falling off almost as sharply through the first half of that year, then tapering off almost to its previous level by 2014. By 2010, many people had posted videos of themselves attempting this challenge on YouTube and other social networking websites. At the peak, Twitter mentions reached nearly 70,000 per day.

Health dangers
The stunt can be dangerous, as there is a risk of gagging or choking on the cinnamon, especially if it forms a clump and clogs one's airways. Accidental inhalation of cinnamon can seriously damage the lungs by causing inflammation and leading to infection. The usual result of this stunt is "a coughing, gagging fit involving clouds of cinnamon" which "leaves some people gasping for air". Sometimes those performing the stunt may gag, choke or cough and accidentally exhale the cinnamon through their noses, coating their skin and mucous membranes in cinnamon. As cinnamon is rich in the compound cinnamaldehyde that can irritate skin and tissues, the challenge often results in considerable irritation, discomfort, burning, or itching of the affected nasal tissue and nostrils. Preclinical studies in rats have shown that the cellulose fibers which comprise cinnamon are also responsible for triggering allergic hypersensitivity reactions. On YouTube, people have been seen "coughing, choking and lunging for water, usually as friends watch and laugh." Vomiting is also known to have occurred.

Cinnamon contains the chemical coumarin which is moderately toxic to the liver and kidney if ingested in large amounts. 

The cinnamon challenge can be life-threatening or fatal. In the first three months of 2012, American poison control centers received over a hundred phone calls as a result of the cinnamon challenge. A high-school student in Michigan spent four days in a hospital after attempting the cinnamon challenge. Pneumonia, inflammation and scarring of the lungs, and collapsed lungs are further risks.

In popular culture
The cinnamon challenge was aired on the twelfth series of the reality television show Big Brother UK, in which show participants were to ingest ground cinnamon without the aid of water. Radio programs have also aired segments of people performing this stunt, and others in the public limelight have been reported as airing the stunt for public display, including NBA players Nick Young and JaVale McGee.

Many people upload their cinnamon challenge to YouTube. Comedian Colleen Ballinger told The Wall Street Journal that she took the challenge in character as Miranda Sings, in 2012, to increase her YouTube traffic after hundreds of her fans had asked her to take the challenge. Her video received more than 2 million views, even though it is on a discontinued YouTube channel. Another comedian, GloZell Green, has attracted more than 50 million views with her cinnamon challenge video, in which she uses a soup ladle full of cinnamon instead of the usual tablespoon. 

A large group attempt at the cinnamon challenge was held in 2012  at RMIT University in Australia and involved 64 participants in quick succession. In a 2012 episode of the Discovery Channel series MythBusters, each member of the Build Team attempted the challenge. Kari Byron and Grant Imahara failed, while Tory Belleci completed it by tucking his spoonful into his cheek and letting saliva accumulate in his mouth until he could swallow. However, it took him more than 60 seconds to do so.

In the 2013 episode of Chicago Fire titled "Defcon 1", a cinnamon challenge is held to determine who will get to live in Severide's new apartment. The challenge is abandoned, and the team is reprimanded by the chief. In 2015, Freddie Flintoff took the challenge on A League of Their Own (S9 ep1), and Criminal Minds actor Matthew Gray Gubler was recorded taking the challenge unsuccessfully. The challenge is also featured on Fox's Family Guys 14th-season opener, "Pilling Them Softly", in which Peter Griffin makes numerous attempts.

See also
Banana Sprite challenge
Gallon challenge
Saltine cracker challenge
Salt and ice challenge
Consumption of Tide Pods

References

Challenges
Competitive eating
Viral videos
2000s fads and trends
Articles containing video clips
Cinnamon
2001 introductions